Green hosting or eco-friendly hosting is Internet hosting that involves strategies to reduce the environmental impact of their activities. These may include the increased use of renewable energy, planting trees, plants, and grass around and over data centers, and more day-to-day activities such as energy conservation and the use of energy-saving appliances.

Green hosting may also utilize green marketing, to allay consumer concerns, and carbon offsetting, the purchasing of green certificates, to offset carbon emissions.

Take up
Adoption of green hosting was initially very slow in the early 2000s, largely because many of the first hosting companies to offer the service were doing so at a price premium. Moreover, awareness among consumers about the environmental impacts of hosting was, at best, limited. Today, though, the market has changed dramatically, with many hosting companies offering green services at no extra cost. Consumer awareness has also increased. A recent study of 543 US adults found that more than 60 percent of people are swayed to purchase from an online shop if the website explicitly claims to use green energy. Seventy-eight percent of consumers say that the environmental practices of online shops are important to them and over 70 percent believe that using a green hosting provider is a valid and acceptable way for a website to put across its 'green' image.

World Internet usage statistics show that the Internet is still rapidly growing in the U.S. and growing from 400 to 1000% a year, worldwide. A green host on the other hand, theoretically produces zero . In 2008, it was estimated that if energy consumption due to web hosting keeps raising at the then-current rate by 2020, then the industry would be polluting the planet more than the airline industry.

The percentage of electricity consumption varies between organizations, but the United States Department of Energy estimates that 10 percent of the United States federal government’s electricity use goes to data centers.

Green hosting strategies
A green organization doesn't necessarily have to have access to green power from wind, water, or solar energy, they can also purchase green certificates to offset the use and cost of conventional energy. Hosting sites that contain Green-E certification labels are organizations that voluntarily adhere to strict environmental guidelines. Other recognized certificates which are regularly used in the web hosting industry include The Gold Standard, Green Power Partnership, VCS (Verified Carbon Standard) and Climate Action Reserve.

See also
 Green computing
 Internet hosting
 Web hosting service
 Clustered web hosting

References 

Web hosting